Nurmijärvi was a bird lake in Nurmijärvi municipality, in Finland. Its surface was first measured in the 1920s and it completely dried up in the 1950s. It was also called Kirkkojärvi (engl, Churchlake).

References 

Former lakes of Europe
Nature of Nurmijärvi